H. C. Speir (October 6, 1895 – April 22, 1972) was an American "talent broker" and record store owner from Jackson, Mississippi.  He was responsible for launching the recording careers of most of the greatest Mississippi blues musicians in the 1920s and 1930s. It has been said that, "Speir was the godfather of Delta Blues" and was "a musical visionary". Without Speir, Mississippi's greatest natural resource might have gone untapped."

Biography
Born Henry Columbus Speir in Prospect, Mississippi, Speir was a white businessman who ran a music and mercantile store on Farish Street, in Jackson's black neighborhood.  In 1926, through selling blues records in his store, he began working as a scout for the record companies producing the records, such as Okeh, Victor, Gennett, Columbia, Vocalion, Decca and Paramount.

Using a metal disc machine in his store, Speir made demo recordings of the musicians that he sent to the labels, before arranging for more formal recording sessions.  Word spread among blues musicians that Speir could help them make records, and many came to audition at the store.  This audition process — along with the ensuing recording sessions — was dramatized in the Wim Wenders-directed installment of the television mini-series Martin Scorsese Presents the Blues: A Musical Journey, entitled "The Soul of a Man", which aired on PBS in 2003.

Among the numerous musicians whom Speir introduced to the record companies were William Harris, Ishman Bracey, Tommy Johnson,  Charlie Patton, Son House, Skip James, Robert Johnson, Bo Carter, Willie Brown, the Mississippi Sheiks, Blind Joe Reynolds, Blind Roosevelt Graves, Geeshie Wiley, and Robert Wilkins.  He also auditioned, but turned down, Jimmie Rodgers.

Speir retired from recording in 1936, and left Farish Street after a 1942 fire at his store. In the 1960s, Speir was extensively interviewed by blues scholar Gayle Dean Wardlow about the recordings he had made. On April 22, 1972, Speir died at his home in Pearl, Mississippi after a heart attack. He is buried alongside his wife at Lakewood Memorial Park Cemetery, in Clinton, 
Hinds County, Mississippi.

Speir was posthumously inducted into the Blues Hall of Fame in 2005.

References

External links
H. C. Speir bio
H. C. Speir interview (introduction)
H. C. Speir interview (part 1)
H. C. Speir interview (part 2)
H. C. Speir interview (part 3)

1895 births
1972 deaths
Gennett Records artists
People from Newton County, Mississippi
People from Pearl, Mississippi